Schorte is a river of Thuringia, Germany. It flows into the Ilm in Ilmenau.

See also
List of rivers of Thuringia

Rivers of Thuringia
Ilmenau
Rivers of Germany